Quick Draw McGraw is a fictional anthropomorphic horse and the protagonist and title character of The Quick Draw McGraw Show. He is a white horse, wearing a red Stetson cowboy hat, a red holster belt, a light blue bandana, and occasionally spurs. He was voiced by Daws Butler. All 45 of his cartoons that originally aired between 1959 and 1961 were written by Michael Maltese, known best for his work at the Warner Bros. cartoon studio. The cartoon was nominated for an Emmy Award in 1960.

Character description
Quick Draw was usually depicted as a sheriff in a series of short films set in the Old West. Quick Draw was often accompanied by his deputy, a Mexican burro called Baba Looey (also voiced by Daws Butler), who spoke English with a Mexican accent and called his partner "Queeks Draw". In the Spanish American version, Quick Draw (Tiro Loco McGraw) speaks in a very English-influenced accent, and Baba Looey (Pepe Trueno, or Pepe Luis in some episodes) speaks in a very Mexican accent, so it was clear that Quick Draw was the alien, and there was no need to adapt any feature of the story. In the Brazilian version, Quick Draw speaks in a drawling Portuguese which along with his hispanized name (Pepe Legal) would suggest he was either a Texan-American or Mexican cowboy.

Quick Draw satirized the westerns that were popular among the American public at the time. His character was well-intentioned, but somewhat dim. His main catchphrases were "Now hold on there!" and "I'll do the thin'in' around here and don't you forget it!" Also if he got hurt he would often say "Ooooh that smarts!" One of the main running gags in the shorts was him accidentally shooting himself with his own six-shooter.

Another featured character was Snuffles, the bloodhound dog that would point to his mouth and "ah-ah-ah-" when he wanted a biscuit, then hug himself, leap up in the air, and float back down after having eaten one.

Personality
Quick Draw was himself a horse caricature that walked on two legs like a human (as did Baba Looey), and had "hands" that were hooves with thumbs and could hold objects such as guns. This enabled the show's producers to depict him riding into town on a realistic horse, and as seen in the show's opening credits, driving a stagecoach pulled by a whole team of realistic horses. This aspect was made light of in the 1980s made-for-television film The Good, the Bad, and Huckleberry Hound, which featured Quick Draw.

El Kabong

In certain cases, Quick Draw would also assume the identity of the Spanish masked vigilante El Kabong (a spoof of Zorro). His introduction went as follows – "Of all the heroes in legend and song, there's none as brave as El Kabong". As El Kabong, Quick Draw would attack his foes by swooping down on a rope with the war cry "OLÉ!" and hitting them on the head with an acoustic guitar (after shouting "KABOOOOOONG!"), which is always referred to as a "kabonger", producing a distinctive kabong sound and usually destroying the guitar in the process. The "guitar" was usually drawn as a four strung cuatro. On the cartoon's soundtrack, the "kabong" sound effect was produced by a foley artist striking the detuned open strings of a cheap acoustic guitar. Comedian Kenny Moore received the nickname of "El Kabong" on some websites due to his infamous assault of a heckler with the guitar he played as part of his act.

Guest appearances in other media
 Quick Draw McGraw occasionally appeared in other Hanna-Barbera productions, including 1973's Yogi's Gang, 1977–1978's Laff-A-Lympics, a celebrity roast honoring Fred Flintstone on the TV special Hanna-Barbera's All-Star Comedy Ice Revue (1978) and the 1979 TV special Casper's First Christmas, and in an episode from the short-lived 1978 series Yogi's Space Race.
 Quick Draw McGraw and Baba Looey appeared in The Yogi Bear Show episode "Yogi's Birthday Party".
 He was a main character in Yogi's Treasure Hunt.
 In the "Fender Bender 500" segment of the 1990s Wake, Rattle, and Roll, Quick Draw McGraw and Baba Looey are the featured racers where they drive a padded wagon-modeled monster truck called the Texas Twister. Quick Draw McGraw was voiced by Greg Burson, while Baba Looey was voiced by Neil Ross.
 In Yo Yogi!, Quick Draw McGraw (again voiced by Greg Burson) and Baba Looey (voiced by Henry Polic II) are seen as Wild West entertainers.
 Greg Burson reprises his role of Quick Draw McGraw when he and Baba Looey appeared in the 39th episode of Samurai Jack titled "Couple on a Train" or "The Good, The Bad, and the Beautiful". They were seen on the train on which Samurai Jack was riding.
 Quick Draw McGraw appeared in the Robot Chicken episode "Ban on the Fun" in a sketch titled "Laff-A-Munich", voiced by Seth Green. He dressed up as El Kabong trying to save the Yogi Yahooeys from the Really Rottens only to be killed by Dread Baron.
 Quick Draw McGraw appeared in an episode of The Simpsons titled "Million Dollar Abie" as El Kabong during the song "Springfield Blows" with celebrity look-alikes.
 Quick Draw appeared as an elderly man in the I Am Weasel episode "I Am My Lifetime".
 Quick Draw appeared in the Class of 3000 episode "Home", voiced by Tom Kenny.
 Quick Draw McGraw and Baba Looey appeared in the South Park episode "Imaginationland Episode III". They join the good imaginary characters fighting the evil characters in the final battle.
 Quick Draw also appeared as a minor antagonist in Harvey Birdman, Attorney at Law and the main antagonist of his only appearance "Guitar Control", voiced by Maurice LaMarche impersonating Charlton Heston. He appears as a defendant for being charged with carrying a concealed weapon (his guitar) when he was about to use it on some criminals as El Kabong.
 Quick Draw's dog Snuffles made a special guest appearance on an episode of Johnny Bravo in which Johnny follows a woman whom he mistakes for his mother. In the episode, Snuffles is assigned by the police to help find Johnny – provided, of course, he is given doggy snacks along the way.
 Quick Draw appeared in the final issue of Exit, Stage Left!: The Snagglepuss Chronicles. In the same issue, he was also portrayed as Huckleberry Hound's lover.
 Quick Draw makes an appearance in the Wacky Races episode "Much Ado About Wacky", voiced by Billy West.
 Quick Draw McGraw and Baba Looey make a cameo as silhouettes in the 2020 Animaniacs revival segment "Suffragette City".
 Quick Draw McGraw appears in the series Jellystone!, voiced by Bernardo de Paula. In the series, El Kabong has been changed to being his actual name and is Latino. He is shown as Jellystone's residential superhero who clashes with this show's version of The Banana Splits (who are depicted as cartoonish yet effective criminals) and wields a guitar named Susan (voiced by Melissa Villaseñor). El Kabong is also the teacher of Jellystone's school.

In advertisements
 Quick Draw was the mascot for Sugar Smacks in the early 1960s.
 Quick Draw made a cameo in a MetLife commercial in 2012.

Parodies
 There are references to "El Kabong" in the TV series The Critic – Jay Sherman's father, Franklin Sherman, imitates El Kabong, swooping from chandeliers dressed similar to Zorro and hitting people over the head with a guitar.
 In the professional wrestling world, the name "El Kabong" was used by then-Extreme Championship Wrestling commentator Joey Styles to describe when a popular ECW wrestler, New Jack, used an acoustic guitar as a weapon during a match. The act is also used by former World Wrestling Federation employee The Honky Tonk Man, former enhancement talent Quick Draw Rick McGraw, former Total Nonstop Action Wrestling Vice President and wrestler Jeff Jarrett, and current World Wrestling Entertainment wrestler Elias.
 Noted radio producer Gary Dell'Abate, who has worked for radio "shock jock" Howard Stern since the early 1980s, has been nicknamed "Baba Booey" for many years, after a mispronunciation of Quick Draw McGraw's sidekick, Baba Looey. "Baba Booey" became a catchphrase for Howard Stern fans for decades, usually shouted out in a large crowd.

Merchandise
 McFarlane Toys produced a figure of Quick Draw McGraw as El Kabong as part of their Hanna-Barbera toy line.
 In 1991, Hi-Tec Software published a licensed Quick Draw McGraw video game.

References in popular music
Quick Draw McGraw is referred to in Busta Rhymes' songs "So Hardcore" and "Everything Remains Raw".  He is also referred to in MF Doom's Viktor Vaughn song "Modern Day Mugging".  Lil Wayne refers to Quick Draw McGraw in his songs "Fireman" and  "What's Wrong With Them?"  Quick Draw McGraw is also referred to in House of Pain's song "Boom Shalock Lock Boom (Butch Vig Mix)". The song appeared on the EP, Shamrocks and Shenanigans.  The Game's "One Blood (Remix)" refers to Quick Draw McGraw.

See also
 List of fictional horses

References

External links

 Quick Draw McGraw at Don Markstein's Toonopedia. Archived from the original on November 4, 2016

Animated characters introduced in 1959
Cartoon mascots
Cereal advertising characters
Fictional anthropomorphic characters
Fictional horses
Fictional sheriffs
Fictional vigilantes
Hanna-Barbera characters
Male characters in animation
Male characters in advertising
Yogi Bear characters
Television characters introduced in 1959
Western (genre) gunfighters
Western (genre) peace officers